Mueang Mukdahan is the capital district (amphoe mueang) of Mukdahan province, northeastern Thailand.

Geography
Neighboring districts are (from the southeast clockwise) Don Tan, Nikhom Kham Soi, Nong Sung, Khamcha-i, and Dong Luang of Mukdahan Province; That Phanom of Nakhon Phanom province; and Wan Yai of Mukdahan Province. To the east across the Mekong River is the Laotian province of Savannakhet.

The important water resource is the Mekong River.

History
The district dates back to the Mueang Mukdahan, which was administered by the Monthon Udon Thani. In 1907 it was made a district of Nakhon Phanom province. On 27 September 1982 the southern part of Nakhon Phanom was split off to form the new province Mukdahan, and the Mukdahan district was renamed "Mueang Mukdahan" as the capital district of the new province.

Administration 
The district is divided into 13 sub-districts (tambons), which are further subdivided into 144 villages (mubans). The town (thesaban mueang) Mukdahan covers parts of tambon Mukdahan and the entire tambon Si Bun Rueang. The sub-district municipality (thesaban tambon) Dong Yen covers the whole tambon of the same name. There are a further 12 tambon administrative organizations (TAO).

References

External links
amphoe.com (Thai)

Mueang Mukdahan